The Member of Parliament for Ogmore in Bridgend County Borough, Sir Raymond Powell, of the Labour Party died on 7 December 2001.

The by-election to fill the seat was held on 14 February 2002.  Labour faced no realistic challenge in this very safe seat and retained it easily, with only Plaid Cymru making progress from their 2001 result. The Socialist Labour Party, who had not previously stood, achieved a good result for a minor party and retained their deposit.

Electoral history

Results

See also
 1931 Ogmore by-election
 1946 Ogmore by-election
 2016 Ogmore by-election
 Ogmore constituency
 List of United Kingdom by-elections
 United Kingdom by-election records

References

External links
British Parliamentary By Elections: Campaign literature from the by-election

By-elections to the Parliament of the United Kingdom in Welsh constituencies
Ogmore by-election
2000s elections in Wales
Ogmore by-election
Ogmore by-election
Politics of Bridgend County Borough